Walter Sidmonds Franklin, III. (May 24, 1884 in Ashland, Maryland – August 17, 1972 in Northeast Harbor, Maine) was the 12th president of the Pennsylvania Railroad (PRR).

He graduated from Harvard College in 1906, and began his PRR career as a platform clerk in Philadelphia, Pennsylvania. In the 1930s, he served as president of a PRR affiliate, the Detroit, Toledo & Ironton Railroad. He was later vice-president of another PRR affiliate, the Long Island Rail Road (LIRR). Although close to retirement age when elected, he served as PRR president, 1948 to 1954. Following his retirement, he served as LIRR acting president, 1954 to 1955, and on the PRR board of directors until 1959.

See also
 List of railroad executives

1884 births
1972 deaths
20th-century American railroad executives
Businesspeople from Philadelphia
Pennsylvania Railroad people
Harvard College alumni
Long Island Rail Road people
Franklin military family
People from Cockeysville, Maryland